The French Riviera Marathon is a marathon held annually along the south east coast of France, between the cities of Nice and Cannes. The event was first held in 2008, when the race achieved its full capacity of 10,000 runners, setting a new world record attendance for an event on its debut. Although the race has only been competed since 2008, it trails only the Paris Marathon in terms of participation within France. In 2013, it was listed as an IAAF Bronze Label Road Race for the first time, a status it retained in 2014.

The race begins in the Albert I Garden in Nice, and then progresses along the French Riviera, visiting Saint-Laurent-du-Var, Cagnes-sur-Mer, Villeneuve-Loubet, Antibes, Juan-les-Pins and Golfe-Juan before arriving in Cannes and finishing on the Promenade de la Croisette, in front of the Carlton Cannes hotel. In addition to the full marathon, a "2 x 21.1 km" relay race was added in 2013, in which runners can race in pairs, with one person running the first half of the race, and then the other running the second half of the race.

In the men's races, Kenyan and Ethiopian athletes have won every race, with each nation claiming three victories. The course record is held by Lucas Kanda, who completed the race in 2:08:40 in 2011. Ethiopian runners have also been successful in the women's races, winning on all but one occasion. The first race was won by a Russian, Oksana Kuzmicheva. The women's course record holder is Radiya Roba, who finished in 2:30:37 in 2010.

Results

References

Marathons in France
Annual sporting events in France
2008 establishments in France
Recurring events established in 2008
Autumn events in France